Capela may refer to:

Places 
Capela (Penafiel), a parish in Penafiel Municipality, Portugal
Capela, Sergipe, a municipality in the Brazilian state of Sergipe
Capela, Alagoas, a municipality in the Brazilian state of Alagoas
Capela, Râmnicu Vâlcea, a neighborhood in Râmnicu Vâlcea
Capela Hill, a hill in the western part of the Romanian town of Râmnicu Vâlcea
A Capela, a place in Galicia, Spain
Capelas, a civil parish on the island of São Miguel in the Portuguese Azores.

People 
Aníbal Capela, a Portuguese professional footballer
Clint Capela, Swiss professional basketball player (NBA, Europe)
Manuel Capela, a Portuguese footballer who played as goalkeeper
Capela (footballer) (Fernando Jorge Barbosa Martins, born 1986), Portuguese football midfielder

Music 
Mestre de capela
Capela Real, Lisbon 
Capela Real do Rio de Janeiro, 1808

See also
Kapela (disambiguation)
Cappella (disambiguation)
Capella (disambiguation)

Portuguese-language surnames